Solta o Pavão is a 1975 album by Brazilian artist Jorge Ben. The title of the album literally means "unleash the peacock" and refers to the outward expression of inner beauty.

Track listing
All tracks written by Jorge Ben

 "Zagueiro" – 3:03
 "Assim Falou Santo Tomás de Aquino" – 2:56
 "Velhos, Flores, Criancinhas e Cachorros" – 3:18
 "Dorothy" – 3:57
 "Cuidado com o Bulldog" – 2:57
 "Para Ouvir no Rádio (Luciana)" – 4:20
 "O Rei Chegou, Viva o Rei" – 3:04
 "Jorge de Capadócia" – 3:53
 "Se Segura Malandro" – 2:56
 "Dumingaz" – 3:31
 "Luz Polarizada" – 2:23
 "Jesualda" – 2:44

References

1975 albums
Jorge Ben albums
Philips Records albums